Ebiripo is a steamed cocoyam common amongst the Remo people in Ogun state, especially those that are not of Yoruba origin.

Overview 
Cocoyam is blended, wrapped in moin-moin leaves and cook until it's done. Ebiripo is best eaten with egusi soup or pepper sauce.

See also 
Nigeria cuisine

Iperu, Ogun state

References 

Nigerian cuisine
Puddings
Steamed foods
Yoruba cuisine